is a Japanese politician who served as the Minister of Justice from 2016 to 2017. He studied at and graduated from Hitotsubashi University.

References 

1949 births
Hitotsubashi University alumni
Japanese politicians
Living people
Politicians from Akita Prefecture